Johanne James is the drummer for British progressive metal band Threshold. He joined the band officially, replacing Mark Heaney, in 2001, to record the album Hypothetical, which occurred after having toured with the band in support of the albums Extinct Instinct and Clone. He also fronts the three-piece band Kyrbgrinder, in which he is the vocalist and the drummer. He is also the drummer for Symphony of Pain. He has been awarded Best Drummer by the Classic Rock Society five times, in 2004, 2006, 2007, 2008 and 2014.

Discography

With Threshold
Hypothetical (full-length, 2001)
Concert in Paris (live album, 2002)
Critical Mass (full-length, 2002)
Wireless (remix album, 2003)
Critical Energy (live album, 2004)
Subsurface (full-length, 2004)
Surface to Stage (live album, 2006)
"Pressure" (single, 2006)
"Pilot in the Sky of Dreams" (single, 2007)
Dead Reckoning (full-length, 2007)
March of Progress (full-length, 2012)
For the Journey (full-length, 2014)
Legends of the Shires (full-length, 2017)
Dividing Lines (full-length, 2022)

With Kyrbgrinder
Defiance (full-length, 2007)
Cold War Technology (full-length, 2010)
Chronicles of a Dark Machine (full-length, 2015)

With Symphony Of Pain
Virology (full-length, 2019)

with Ayreon
Transitus (full-length, 2020)

References

English heavy metal drummers
British male drummers
Living people
Year of birth missing (living people)
Black British rock musicians
Threshold (band) members